Harvard Aviation Field was an airfield operational in the early-20th century in Quincy, Massachusetts.

History
In 1910 the Harvard Aeronautical Society leased an undeveloped  parcel of marshland and upland located on the Squantum Peninsula from the New York, New Haven and Hartford Railroad and named it Harvard Aviation Field.  It used the airfield to hold the 1910 and 1911 Harvard-Boston Aero Meets.  In addition, other groups used the Harvard Aviation Field for the first Intercollegiate Glider Meet in 1911, as well as for the ill-fated 1912 Boston Air Meet.

The airfield's location on the Harvard 1910 meet posters was given as Atlantic, Massachusetts, and the railroad station nearest the field was also called Atlantic. This station was just after the old Neponset station on the New Haven Railroad line (Old Colony Railroad branch) and right before the modern day Red Line North Quincy Station.

In 1915, after the lease expired with the Harvard Aeronautical Society, the New Haven Railroad rented the former Harvard Aviation Field to Harry M. Jones, who used the site to provide flight instruction.  W. Starling Burgess also made occasional use of the former Harvard Aviation Field around this time for flight testing purposes and to provide flight instruction to buyers of his company's aircraft.

In 1916, Sturtevant Aeroplane Company of Hyde Park in Boston took over the former Harvard Aviation Field for flight testing and flight instruction purposes. The Sturtevant Company, which later in 1945 became part of Westinghouse, was the first builder of airplane engines in Massachusetts, the first to produce all-metal fuselage planes for the US Navy and Army, and the only large scale aircraft manufacturer in the Boston area.

Accidents and incidents
Harriet Quimby and William A.P. Willard were killed there in a plane crash on 1 July 1912.

References

Defunct airports in Massachusetts
Airports in Norfolk County, Massachusetts
Quincy, Massachusetts
Harvard University